Gareth Hewitt (born 14 September 1976) is a former professional rugby league footballer who played as a  in the 1990s and 2000s. He played at representative level for Scotland, and at club level for the Leeds Rhinos, Salford City Reds, Sheffield Eagles and the Keighley Cougars.

International honours
Gareth Hewitt won a cap for Scotland in 1998 while at Leeds.

References

External links
Woodsy's Winners and Losers: Salford
Marsh double lifts Barrow

Keighley Cougars players
Leeds Rhinos players
Living people
Place of birth missing (living people)
Salford Red Devils players
Sheffield Eagles players
Scotland national rugby league team players
1976 births
Rugby league centres